Ovidiu Maitec (December 13, 1925–March 18, 2007) was a Romanian sculptor.

Born in Arad, he studied at the Bucharest Fine Arts Institute from 1945 to 1950. For several years he taught artistic anatomy at Bucharest's N. Tonitza Fine Arts High School; meanwhile, from 1950 to 1956, he was teaching assistant at his alma mater. Numerous exhibitions devoted to Maitec's work were held both in Romania and abroad, and examples thereof are held by the Fonds national d'art contemporain and Tate. He was awarded the Romanian Academy prize in 1967, followed by the grand prize of the Fine Artists' Union in 1974, the Cultural Merit Order in 1975 and the Order of Merit of the Italian Republic in 1985. Elected a corresponding member of the Romanian Academy in 1990, he was elevated to titular membership in 1999. He died in Paris, and was buried at Bellu cemetery.

Notes

References
 Alina-Cristina Cristea, "Arta lemnului în plastica lui Ovidiu Maitec", in the Vâlcea County Museum's Buridava, 10, 2012, pp. 284–88.
Corina Teacă, "Maitec Ovidiu", entry in Ioana Vlasiu (ed.), Dicționarul sculptorilor din România: secolele XIX-XX, vol. II. Bucharest: Institutul de Istoria Artei "George Oprescu", 2012, 

1925 births
2007 deaths
People from Arad, Romania
Romanian sculptors
Titular members of the Romanian Academy
Recipients of the Order of Merit of the Italian Republic
Burials at Bellu Cemetery